Ashbourne is a locality in Victoria, Australia. It is located on Falloons Road in the Shire of Macedon Ranges, to the west of Woodend.

Ashbourne Post Office opened on 16 December 1899 (known as Campaspe until 1900).

References

Towns in Victoria (Australia)
Shire of Macedon Ranges